"Galvanize" is a song by British electronic music duo the Chemical Brothers featuring vocals by American rapper Q-Tip. It was released on 22 November 2004 as the first single from their fifth studio album, Push the Button (2005). 

The song peaked at  3 on the UK Singles Chart on 23 January 2005. It was the Chemical Brothers' highest charting single in their native United Kingdom since "Hey Boy Hey Girl", which had also reached No. 3 in 1999. In Spain, it reached No. 1 and held the top spot for two weeks. In Australia, the song was ranked No. 65 on Triple J's Hottest 100 of 2004.

"Galvanize" was used as the first song to play at the Athletes Parade and the opening and closing ceremonies of the 2012 London Olympic and Paralympic Games.

Composition
The track features a distinct Moroccan Chaabi string sample from Najat Aatabou's song "Hadi Kedba Bayna (Obvious lie)". The track also features rapping by Q-Tip (member of A Tribe Called Quest). In part of the song, a sample from the group's early single "Leave Home" plays.

Critical reception
Pitchfork Medias Scott Plagenhoef stated the song along with "The Boxer" "harks back to the duo's early B-Boy/techno days" but missed "the ferocity and sub-bass rattlings of their earlier cousins, and here play second fiddle to unremarkable verses and nasally vocals."

It won the Grammy Award for Best Dance Recording in February 2006.

Music video
The music video was filmed in Málaga, Spain, and directed by Adam Smith. It involves three North African boys wearing clown face paint, who head into a club named Lyceo during a krump dance battle. The name of one of these boys is Bilal according to his father's line at the beginning (بِلالْ! اطفأ النورْ ونامْ, literally "Bilal! Turn off the light and go to sleep."). One of the boys starts dancing in the battle, but they are caught and taken away by the police afterwards.

Track listings

 UK CD1
 "Galvanize"
 "Rize Up"

 UK CD2
 "Galvanize"
 "Galvanize" 
 "Electronic Battle Weapon 7"
 "Galvanize" 

 UK and US 12-inch single
A. "Galvanize" 
B. "Electronic Battle Weapon 7"

 Australia CD single
 "Galvanize"
 "Galvanize" 
 "Electronic Battle Weapon 7"

 US CD single
 "Galvanize" 
 "Rize Up"
 "Electronic Battle Weapon 7"

 Japanese CD EP
 "Galvanize"  – 4:27
 "Galvanize"  – 7:31
 "Galvanize"  – 7:32
 "Rize Up" – 4:05
 "Electronic Battle Weapon 7" – 7:26
 "Galvanize"

Charts

Weekly charts

Year-end charts

Certifications

Release history

References

2004 singles
2004 songs
Astralwerks singles
The Chemical Brothers songs
Grammy Award for Best Dance Recording
Málaga
Number-one singles in Greece
Number-one singles in Spain
Q-Tip (musician) songs
Songs written by Ed Simons
Songs written by Q-Tip (musician)
Songs written by Tom Rowlands
Virgin Records singles